Charles du Dros (fl. 1544) was the French governor of Mondovì during the Italian War of 1542, and was killed during the Battle of Ceresole.

References

 Oman, Charles. A History of the Art of War in the Sixteenth Century.  London: Methuen & Co., 1937.

1544 deaths
French military personnel killed in action
Military leaders of the Italian Wars
Year of birth unknown
16th-century French people